The Commemorative medal for voluntary service in Free France was a French commemorative war medal established by decree on 4 April 1946 on the 1945 proposition of general Edgard de Larminat to the Minister to the armies.

The general proposed the creation of a distinctive award for the members of the Free French Forces who fought the Axis forces on most fronts during World War II.  Beginning with a modest 7,000 men in July 1940, the Free French Forces had grown to approximately 70,000 by June 1942 and were especially active in North Africa, where they particularly distinguished themselves during the Battle of Bir Hakeim.  These forces would later form the nucleus of the 1st Free French Division which distinguished itself in the Italian campaign of 1944 under general Koenig and of the 2nd Armoured Division in the liberation of Paris under general Leclerc.

Also, part of the whole, the Free French Naval Forces and Free French Air Force, although limited in numbers and equipment nonetheless took part in most major engagements alongside allied forces including in the Soviet Union.  Free French Forces had grown to over half a million by 1944 and numbered well over a million in 1945, they were instrumental in the final liberation of their country and participated in the invasion of Nazi Germany.

Award statute
The Commemorative medal for voluntary service in Free France was awarded to all persons, civilian or military, French or foreign nationals:
having voluntarily contracted in the Free French Forces (including Free French air and naval forces) prior to 1 August 1943 (for soldiers);
having effectively served Free France on the territories controlled by the National Committee in London and in foreign countries prior to 1 August 1943 (for civil servants).

The medal was bestowed accompanied by an award certificate and was often accompanied by a scroll signed by General Charles de Gaulle with the following message in French: "Answering the call of France in mortal peril, you rallied to the Free French Forces. You were of those who, in the front ranks, allowed it to win final victory! At the moment where the goal is attained, I want to thank you in friendship, simply, in the name of France!  1 September 1945."

Upon application for the award, a committee would examine and confirm or deny membership in the Free French Forces. This committee, presided by a superior staff officer of the Free French Forces, was composed of:
an officer of each of the three services;
a representative of the Merchant Navy;
a representative of the Ministry of the Colonies
a representative of civil services of the former National Committee in London;
a representative of intelligence and action networks affiliated with the former National Committee in London;
a member of the office of the committee of the Order of Liberation.

Award description
The Commemorative medal for voluntary service in Free France was struck from silvered bronze in the shape of a Cross of Lorraine with variants of 36 mm to 40 mm high (excluding suspension ring) and 32 mm wide.  Its obverse bore the relief inscription on two lines "FRANCE" on the upper horizontal arm and "LIBRE" on the lower arm.  Its reverse bore the dates "18 JUIN 1940" on the upper arm and "8 MAI 1945" on the lower arm.

The medal hung from a dark blue silk moiré ribbon adorned with 2 mm wide red oblique (from low left to high right) stripes separated by 4 mm.  The ribbon passed through a rectangular rigid suspension ring struck as an integral part of the cross.

Noteworthy recipients 
General Philippe Leclerc de Hauteclocque
 The singer and dancer Josephine Baker
General Marie-Pierre Kœnig
General Gérard Lecointe
General Georges Cabanier
General Pierre Billotte
General Pierre Garbay
General Renaud de Corta
General Jean Simon
General Henri Amiel
General Raoul Magrin-Vernerey
General Martial Valin
Colonel Fred Moore
Lieutenant colonel Albert Fossey-François
Lieutenant commander Elie Touchaleaume
Commander Philippe Kieffer
Wing Commander Pierre Clostermann
Major Rudolf Eggs
Captain François de Labouchère
Capitan Rene Joyeuse (1920–2012), FFL/OSS
Lieutenant Raymond Meyer
Lieutenant René Amiot
Lieutenant Jean-Pierre Berger
Lieutenant Jean-Valentin Brecheisen, French commandos of Africa
Master sergeant Raphaël Onana
Resistance member Pierre Depoid
Journalist Philippe Ragueneau
Politician Marthe Simard

See also

Free French Forces
Free French Naval Forces
Free French Air Force

References

External links
 Museum of the Legion of Honour (in French)

Military awards and decorations of France
Civil awards and decorations of France
Awards established in 1946
French awards
1946 establishments in France